The 1952 UCLA Bruins football team was an American football team that represented the University of California, Los Angeles during the 1952 college football season.  In their fourth year under head coach Red Sanders, the Bruins compiled an 8–1 record (5–1 conference) and finished in second place in the Pacific Coast Conference.

Schedule

References

UCLA
UCLA Bruins football seasons
UCLA Bruins football
UCLA Bruins football